The first Annual MTV Australia Video Music Awards were held on 3 March 2005 at The Big Top Sydney. They were broadcast live on MTV Australia and throughout the world. The event, which followed a Circus Theme, was hosted by The Osbournes.

On the night Punk Rock band Green Day performed two of their hit songs American Idiot and Boulevard of Broken Dreams, Natalie Imbruglia performed her new single Shiver for the first time live, Carmen Electra performed a strip tease, and Kelly Osbourne premiered her new single One Word.

Background 

The establishment of the MTV Australia Video Music Awards ceremony was proposed in 2004 with Australia becoming the seventeenth country to host its own MTV award show. Nominees were announced in December of that year with the inaugural ceremony following in March 2015 as hosted by Sharon and Ozzy Osbourne. The thirteen categories are Video of the Year, Best Male Artist, Best Female Artist, Breakthrough Artist, Best Group, Best Dance Video, Best Pop Video, Best Rock Video, Best R&B Video, Sexiest Video and Best Dressed Video.

Performers

 Simple Plan
 Kelly Osbourne
 Eskimo Joe
 Chingy
 Ja Rule
 Natalie Imbruglia
 Carmen Electra
 Bryan Adams/Shannon Noll
 Delta Goodrem/Brian McFadden
 Grinspoon
 Missy Higgins
 Xzibit
 Green Day
 The Dissociatives

Presenters
 Dannii Minogue
 Anna Nicole Smith
 David Campbell
 Zoe Sheridan
 Gretel Killeen
 Effie
 Shannon Watts
 Nitty
 Keith Urban
 Natalie Bassingthwaighte
 Kelly Slater

Nominees and winners
The winners are in bold.

Video of the Year
 Eminem — "Just Lose It"
 Gwen Stefani — "What You Waiting For?"
 The Dissociatives — "Somewhere Down The Barrel"
 Outkast — "Roses"

Best Male
 Eminem
 Shannon Noll
 Robbie Williams
 Usher

Best Female
 Missy Higgins
 Gwen Stefani
 Delta Goodrem
 Britney Spears

Best Group
 Green Day — "American Idiot"
 Powderfinger — "Sunsets"
 Outkast — "Roses"
 Jet — "Cold Hard Bitch"

Best Breakthrough
 Missy Higgins
 Maroon 5
 Franz Ferdinand
 Thirsty Merc

Best Rock Video
 Green Day — "American Idiot"
 Jet — "Cold Hard Bitch"
 Spiderbait — "Black Betty"
 U2 — "Vertigo"

Best Pop Video
 Ashlee Simpson — "Pieces of Me"
 Delta Goodrem — "Out of the Blue"
 Guy Sebastian — "Out with My Baby"
 Gwen Stefani — "What You Waiting For?"

Best Dance Video
 Britney Spears — "Toxic"
 Fatboy Slim — "Slash Dot Dash"
 Freestylers — "Push Up"
 Usher — "Yeah!"

Best R&B Video
 Beyoncé — "Naughty Girl"
 The Black Eyed Peas — "Hey Mama"
 J-Wess — "Luv Ya"
 Outkast — "Roses"

Sexiest Video
 Beyoncé — "Naughty Girl"
 The Black Eyed Peas — "Hey Mama"
 Britney Spears — "Toxic"
 Robbie Williams — "Radio"

Best Dressed Video
 Gwen Stefani — "What You Waiting For?"
 Delta Goodrem — "Out of the Blue"
 Kylie Minogue — "Chocolate"
 Outkast — "Roses"

Pepsi Viewers Choice
 Delta Goodrem

Supernova Award
 Evermore
 Joel Turner
 Missy Higgins
 Anthony Callea

VH1 Music First Award
 Cher

Free Your Mind Award
 AusAID

Award moments
 The Red Carpet was the longest in the Southern Hemisphere and the longest ever used for an MTV Award Ceremony.
 Anna Nicole Smith removed her top while presenting.

References

 Rumage.com.au Article

External links
 MTV Australia
 Official AVMA site

MTV Australia Awards
2005 music awards
2005 in Australian music
2000s in Sydney